Podgozd is a village in the Municipality of Žužemberk in southeastern Slovenia. It lies south of Dvor on the right bank of the Krka River. The area is part of the historical region of Lower Carniola. The municipality is now included in the Southeast Slovenia Statistical Region.

References

External links
 
Podgozd at Geopedia

Populated places in the Municipality of Žužemberk